Matan Roditi (born 6 October 1998) is an Israeli Olympic marathon swimmer. His 4th place at the 2020 Olympics is the closest Israel has gone to an Olympic medal in swimming.

Career
Roditi represented Israel at the 2020 Summer Olympics in the 10km swim marathon.

Roditi finished in 4th place. Roditi finished with a time of 1:49:24.9 finishing 23.8 seconds behind bronze medalist Gregorio Paltrinieri (1:49:01.1) of Italy, silver medalist Kristóf Rasovszky (1:48:59.0) of Hungary ,and gold medalist  Florian Wellbrock (1:48:33.7) of Germany.

To date, his swim is the closest the state of Israel has gotten to earning an Olympic medal in the sport of swimming.

Career highlights

References

External links
 
 

Living people
1998 births
Israeli male swimmers
Olympic swimmers of Israel
Swimmers at the 2020 Summer Olympics